Kundrodi is a small village in Mundra Taluka in Kachchh District of Gujarat, India, and is located between Anjar and Mundra. It is around 40 km from Gandhidham and around 60 km from Bhuj. The postal code is 370410. Kundrodi is surrounded by Mandvi Taluka towards west, Anjar Taluka towards North, Adipur Taluka towards East and Bhuj Taluka towards North. Mandvi, Adipur, Bhuj , Gandhidham are the nearby cities to Kundrodi. Kundrodi is very close to the much-coveted Mundra port which is hardly 10 to 15 km from the village.

Demographics
Around 229 families stay in Kundrodi and the total population as per 2011 census of Kundrodi is 986. Gujarati is the Local Language here. However most people speak Kutchi.

Places of worship
Though Kundrodi is very small village, it houses a temple of "Momai Mata / Ambe Mata" who is a Hindu goddess and is considered to be the main temple for entire Chothani (Rachcha) family. Most of the Chothanis have moved and settled to Mumbai/Ahmedabad, however they gather once a year at Kundrodi to worship the deity.

Kundrodi also has many other temples which are maintained and attended by locals.

Industries
Philips Carbon Black Limited (PCBL), part of RP Goenka Group, is a carbon processing industry which is very close to Kundrodi.

Another large industry close to Kundrodi is Chromeni steels Pvt Ltd which is into stainless steel production. This is a Chinese company which has invested around 6000 Crs in this plant.

Notable people and tourism places.
The music director Kalyanji Anandji was born here in 1933. Kalyanji and Anandji were born to Virji Shah on 2 March 1933. Their father was a Kutchi businessman who had migrated from Kutch to Mumbai to start a kirana (provision store).. 
Also, Jungle wood forest homes weekend homes|forest stay is a great tourism place developed and conceptualized by Mr. R.k Jain srv group and designed by srv group in kundrodi, kutch.

References

Villages in Kutch district